The canton of Fezensac is an administrative division of the Gers department, southwestern France. It was created at the French canton reorganisation which came into effect in March 2015. Its seat is in Vic-Fezensac.

It consists of the following communes:
 
Bascous
Bazian
Belmont
Bezolles
Caillavet
Callian
Castillon-Debats
Cazaux-d'Anglès
Courrensan
Dému
Gazax-et-Baccarisse
Justian
Lannepax
Lupiac
Marambat
Mirannes
Mourède
Noulens
Peyrusse-Grande
Peyrusse-Vieille
Préneron
Ramouzens
Riguepeu
Roquebrune
Roques
Rozès
Saint-Arailles
Saint-Jean-Poutge
Saint-Paul-de-Baïse
Saint-Pierre-d'Aubézies
Séailles
Tudelle
Vic-Fezensac

References

Cantons of Gers